Varlı is a village in the Salyan Rayon of Azerbaijan.

References

See also
Birinci Varlı
İkinci Varlı

Populated places in Salyan District (Azerbaijan)